Arne Braut (born 11 October 1950) is a Norwegian politician for the Centre Party.

He served as a deputy representative to the Norwegian Parliament from Sør-Trøndelag during the term 2001–2005.

On the local level, he has background from Oppdal municipal council.

References

1950 births
Living people
Deputy members of the Storting
Centre Party (Norway) politicians
Sør-Trøndelag politicians